Glochidion sisparense is a species of tree in the family Phyllanthaceae. It is endemic to Tamil Nadu in India.

References

sisparense
Flora of Tamil Nadu
Endangered plants
Taxonomy articles created by Polbot